Great Work or great work may refer to:

 A masterpiece or magnum opus, a creation that has been given much critical praise
 Magnum opus (alchemy), the process of working with the prima materia to create the philosopher's stone
 Great Work (Hermeticism), also known as magnum opus, a term used in Hermeticism
 Great Work (Thelema), a term used in Thelema

See also
 Magnum opus (disambiguation)